Life cycle, life-cycle, or lifecycle may refer to:

Science and academia
Biological life cycle, the sequence of life stages that an organism undergoes from birth to reproduction ending with the production of the offspring
Life-cycle hypothesis, in economics
Erikson's stages of psychosocial development, in psychoanalysis

Business
Enterprise life cycle, the process of changing a business enterprise
Project life cycle
Product lifecycle, the stages in the lifespan of a commercial or consumer product
New product development, the process of bringing a new product to market
Life-cycle assessment, the analysis of the environmental impacts associated with a product
Technology lifecycle,  the commercial gain of a product

Software
Software development life cycle
Software release life cycle
Object lifetime of an object in object-oriented programming
Program lifecycle phases are the stages a computer program undergoes, from initial creation to deployment and execution

Systems engineering

Systems development life cycle, a process for planning, creating, testing, and deploying, maintaining, and ultimate disposal of system in all phases of existence.

Arts and entertainment
Life Cycles (The Word Alive album), 2012
Life Cycle (Dave Holland album), 1983
Life Cycle (Sieges Even album), 1988
Life Cycle (Whit Dickey album), 2001
Lifecycle (album), a 2008 album by Yellowjackets

Other uses
Jewish life cycle, a series of traditions associated with major life events in Judaism
Records life-cycle, the treatment of records from their creation to archiving or destruction

See also
Adobe LiveCycle, a server software product used to build applications that automate business processes
Life history (disambiguation)